Aidan Flanagan (born 1974) is an Irish retired hurler who played as a corner-forward for the Tipperary senior hurling team.

Career statistics

Honours

Boherlahen–Dualla
Tipperary Senior Hurling Championship (1): 1996

Tipperary
All-Ireland Under-21 Hurling Championship (1): 1995
Munster Under-21 Hurling Championship (1): 1995
Fitzgibbon Cup with W.I.T. 1995

References

External links

 Aidan Flanagan profile at the Tipp GAA Archives website

1974 births
Living people
Boherlahan-Dualla hurlers
Tipperary inter-county hurlers
Garda Síochána officers